James Aratoon Malcolm, born 1868, was a British-Iranian Armenian financier, arms dealer and journalist.

In early 1916, he was appointed by George V of Armenia as one of the five members of the Armenian National Delegation to lead negotiations during and after the war, and the effective representative in London (the other four members were all based in Paris).

He was Chairman of the Royal Thames Yacht Club, and a founder in 1894 of the British Empire League. He was awarded an OBE in 1948.

Early life
He was the son of Aratoon Malcolm, of Bushehr in Qajar Persia, whose family had lived in Persia "since before Elizabethan days", in shipping and commerce, having acted as treasurers to British Missions to the Shah of Persia. They had numerous contacts with significant financial families in the region such as that of David Sassoon.

He came to England at the age of 13 years old in 1881, for his education, under the guardianship of Albert Sassoon. As a boy he was friends with Albert Goldsmid. He was educated at the private Herne House School in Margate, Kent, before attending Balliol College, Oxford between 1886-9.

Journalism
After leaving university, he published a political-financial newspaper in London. He later became one of the founders and editors of the Hayastan Daily during the Armenian resistance during the Armenian Genocide.

Arms dealing
His arms dealing career began with making the first offer to provide 1,000 sharpshooters for service in Southern Africa, and he fitted out Major Albert Gybbon Spilsbury's Tourmaline yacht for its controversial 1897 expedition to Mogador, Morocco.

Financing activities
As a contractor for public works he proposed to finance the Baku aqueduct, the longest water conduit in Europe which was ultimately financed by Zeynalabdin Taghiyev, the extensions to the London Docks, and the Canadian Trent–Severn Waterway.

In 1912 he negotiated on behalf of the Chinese government the £5 million Crisp loan led by Charles Birch Crisp to the new Republic of China.

Publications
 Partition of Palestine. Suggested alterations in proposed frontiers (Mar 1938), Apollo Press, London
 Origins of the Balfour Declaration: Dr. Weizmann's Contribution (1944), British Museum

Further reading
 Halabian, Martin H. (1962), The Zionism of James A. Malcolm, Armenian patriot, MSc Other Thesis, Brandeis University, Dept. of Near Eastern and Judaic Studies

References

1868 births
Year of death missing
Iranian people of Armenian descent
People from Bushehr
British people of Armenian descent
British people of Iranian descent